The Winter's Tale is a play by William Shakespeare.

Winter's Tale may also refer to:

Films
 The Winter's Tale (1910 film), a 1910 film by the Thanhouser Company
 The Winter's Tale (1967 film), a 1967 British television film
 A Tale of Winter (Conte d'hiver), a 1992 French film
 A Winter Tale, a 2007 Canadian film
 Winter's Tale (film), a 2014 film based on the novel by Mark Helprin (also called  A New York Winter's Tale)

Music
 The Winter's Tale (EP), by BTOB, 2014
 "A Winter's Tale" (David Essex song), 1982
 "A Winter's Tale" (Queen song), 1995
 "A Winter's Tale", a 1968 song by Genesis
 "A Winter's Tale", a song by AFI from AFI
 "A Winter's Tale", a song by Jade Warrior from Last Autumn's Dream

Stage works
 The Winter's Tale (ballet), Christopher Wheeldon's 2014 interpretation of the Shakespeare play
 The Winter's Tale (opera), 2017 opera by Ryan Wigglesworth

Literature
 Winter's Tale (novel), a 1983 novel by Mark Helprin
 "A Winter's Tale", a poem by Dylan Thomas in his 1946 collection Deaths and Entrances
 Winter's Tales, a 1942 short-story collection by Isak Dinesen (Karen Blixen)
 The Breathing Method, subtitled "A Winter's Tale", a novella in the Different Seasons collection by Stephen King 
 Germany. A Winter's Tale, an 1844 satire by Heinrich Heine
 A Redwall Winter's Tale, a children's book

Television
 The Winter's Tale, season 3 of BBC Television Shakespeare
 "A Winter's Tale" (Dawson's Creek), an episode of Dawson's Creek

Other
 Winter's Tale (horse) (1976–2002), a racehorse
 Garfield: Winter's Tail, a video game based on the comic strip Garfield